The men's volleyball tournament at the 1994 Asian Games was held from October 3 to October 16, 1994 in Hiroshima, Japan.

Due to scheduling conflicts with 1994 FIVB Volleyball Men's World Championship, China, Japan and South Korea qualified directly to the second round.

Results
All times are Japan Standard Time (UTC+09:00)

First round

|}

Second round

Pool A

|}

Pool B

|}

5th place match

|}

Final round

Semifinals

|}

Bronze medal match

|}

Final

|}

Final standing

References
 Men's Results
 Results

Men's volleyball